The Dalmahoy Baronetcy, of Dalmahoy, was a title created in the Baronetage of Nova Scotia on 2 December 1679 for John Dalmahoy of that Ilk. The title became extinct upon the death of the fourth baronet, Sir Alexander Dalmahoy, in 1800.

Dalmahoy baronets, of Dalmahoy (1679)
Sir John Dalmahoy, 1st Baronet (1637–?)
Sir Alexander Dalmahoy, 2nd Baronet (1668–1730)
Sir Alexander Dalmahoy, 3rd Baronet (died 1773)
Sir Alexander Dalmahoy, 4th Baronet (died 1800)

References

1679 establishments in Scotland
Dalmahoy
Dalmahoy